A referendum on extending the operation of the Ignalina Nuclear Power Plant was held in Lithuania on 12 October 2008 alongside parliamentary elections. The country's government was obliged to close down Ignalina as part of its treaty of accession to the European Union.

The electorate were asked to vote on the statement: "I approve of the extension of operation of the Ignalina Nuclear Power Plant for a technically safe period, but not longer than completion of the construction of a new nuclear power plant."

Although 91.4% of voters voted in favour of continuing the plant's operation, voter turnout was below the 50% threshold required to make the results valid.

Results

References

External links
The Central Electoral Commission of the Republic of Lithuania 

Referendums in Lithuania
Nuclear power in Lithuania
Nuclear power referendum
Nuclear power referendums
Lithuania